Anhalt Hall is a Texas dancehall owned and operated by the Germania Farmer Verein, an organization started by German settlers in Central Texas in 1875 to help protect their livestock. The hall was used as a stopping point for early settlers traveling between New Braunfels, Texas and Boerne, Texas. Construction began in February 1879 when the first hall measuring 26’X34" was erected by Franz Erben in what is now Spring Branch, Comal County, Texas. In 1880 the first Maifest was held for members only and a dance floor 28’X58' was laid. In 1887 the hall was expanded by 60 feet. In 1891 the hall was again enlarged 20' by 6". In 1894 the Verein held its first agriculture fair which continued into the early 1900s. Chris Herry of New Braunfels, Texas was contracted in 1908 to build the addition to the hall which is the current dance floor at a cost of $2512.37. Mr. Geue had the lighting contract for $192.50. In 1951 the beer garden was added and in 1953 the kitchen was built.

Anhalt Hall has hosted such acts as George Strait, Jerry Jeff Walker, Asleep at the Wheel, Kevin Fowler, and many more. The hall was also used as a set in All the Pretty Horses, starring Matt Damon and Penélope Cruz. Anhalt Hall still holds monthly dances and a spring and fall harvest festival, Maifest and Oktoberfest, respectively.

External links

Texas State Historical Association article on Anhalt Hall

Buildings and structures in Comal County, Texas
Music venues in Texas
Event venues established in 1879
1879 establishments in Texas
German-American culture in Texas
Texas Hill Country
German
National Register of Historic Places in Comal County, Texas